Jackson Krall Jr. (born October 12, 1949) is a drum maker.

Born in Detroit, through the years Jackson's instruments have found their way into the hands of the world's greatest drummers and percussionists, and can be heard on recordings as well as in live performance by many bands, orchestras, and the most popular Broadway and Off-Broadway shows like "Lion King" and "Blue Man Group". In 1984, under the leadership of Toni and Celia Nogueira, Jackson was a founding member and helped write the bylaws of New York's first samba school, the now legendary Empire Loisaida Samba School (Escola de Samba Empire Loisaida).

During the next several years he studied, played and paraded with all the great Brazilian percussionists living in or passing through New York at the time. Eventually Empire Loisaida faded into history, but Jackson remained and continues making instruments and playing avant Jazz drums in New York City.

References

 The New York Times, June 22, 2007, "A Trumpeter in His 80s Feeds the Fires of His Revolution", Nate Chinen, New York City, https://www.nytimes.com/2007/06/22/arts/music/22visi.html?_r=1&pagewanted=print/our-chopin/
 The Village Voice, May 12, 2002, "Our Chopin, A Gift From Cecil Taylor", Gary Giddins, New York City, http://www.villagevoice.com/2002-03-12/music/our-chopin/
 The New York Times, August 8, 1997, "Frantic Poetry on Piano", Ben Rattlif, New York City, https://www.nytimes.com/1997/08/08/arts/frantic-poetry-on-piano.html
 Improjazz, January 2000, "Jackson Krall: Interview", Marc Chaloin, France.
 ''Author unknown, "Jackson Krall, Artist In Detail", Cleanfeed-Records.com, August 31, 2012, http://www.cleanfeed-records.com/artista.asp?intID=125

External links
 "A Brief History of the Drum Kit" by Jackson Krall

1949 births
Living people
20th-century American drummers
American male drummers
20th-century American male musicians